Amanda Hemmingsen-Jaeger is an American politician serving in the Minnesota House of Representatives since 2023. A member of the Minnesota Democratic-Farmer-Labor Party (DFL), Hemmingsen-Jaeger represents District 47A in the eastern Twin Cities metropolitan area, which includes the cities of Woodbury and Maplewood, and parts of Ramsey and Washington Counties in Minnesota.

Early life, education and career 
Hemmingsen-Jaeger attended Wabasha Public Schools as a child. She got her bachelor's in cell biology and development from the University of Minnesota, and her master's in genetics from Iowa State University. Hemmingsen-Jaeger graduated from the Humphery School of Public Affairs in 2016 with a master's in science, technology and environmental policy.

Hemmingsen-Jaeger worked as a forensic scientist for the Minnesota Bureau of Criminal Apprehension from 2011 to 2020. She has worked as a DVS business analyst and legislative analyst for the Minnesota Department of Public Safety and as a FFAID legislative and policy analyst for the Minnesota Department of Human Services. Hemmingsen-Jaeger has also served on a number of state councils, including the Metropolitan Council advisory committee for the Gold Line and the Woodbury for Justice and Equality commission.

Minnesota House of Representatives 
Hemmingsen-Jaeger was first elected to the Minnesota House of Representatives in 2022, following redistricting and the retirement of DFL incumbents Steve Sandell and Tou Xiong. She serves on the Children and Families Finance and Policy, Climate and Energy Finance and Policy, Health Finance and Policy, and Workforce Development Finance and Policy Committees.

Electoral history

Personal life 
Hemmingsen-Jaeger lives in Woodbury, Minnesota with her spouse and their two children.

References

External links 

Members of the Minnesota House of Representatives
Year of birth missing (living people)
Living people